Enoch Arden is a 1915 American short drama film directed by  Christy Cabanne. It is based on the 1864 poem Enoch Arden by Tennyson. Prints of the film exists at the George Eastman House Motion Picture Collection and the UCLA Film and Television Archive.

Plot
Based on a summary in a film magazine, Enoch, Annie, and Walter grow up as friends. Later, Annie decides to marry Enoch, but Walter, though bitter about the decision, remains their friend. Enoch and Annie have two children. Then business takes Enoch on a sailing voyage, which he states will take less than one year, and he asks Walter to look over his family while he is gone. Enoch does not return, and Walter dutifully cares after Enoch's wife and children. After ten years word comes of a wreck seen in the Pacific, and everyone believes Enoch has died. Walter and Annie then marry. One night a stranger comes to the house and through a window sees Walter, Annie, and the children happy. The stranger, who is Enoch, finds an old woman who tells him what happened. Enoch tells her to keep his secret, and then leaves. He later dies with a smile on his face.

Cast
 Alfred Paget as Enoch Arden
 Lillian Gish as Annie Lee
 Wallace Reid as Walter Fenn
 D. W. Griffith as Mr. Ray
 Mildred Harris as A Child

1922 reissue
The film was reissued in 1922 under the title The Fatal Marriage by Robertson-Cole.

Accolades
The film was nominated for the American Film Institute's 2002 list AFI's 100 Years...100 Passions.

References

External links

1915 films
1915 drama films
1915 short films
Silent American drama films
American silent short films
American black-and-white films
Films based on Enoch Arden
Films directed by Christy Cabanne
1910s American films